Ángel Negro ("Dark Angel") is a 2000 Chilean slasher film written and directed by Jorge Olguín.  Ángel Negro is the first Chilean horror film.  After a mysterious accident, a group of friends is hunted down by a masked killer.

Plot 
The film depicts the story of Gabriel Echeverría, who, years after graduating from high school with his group of friends, learns that his former classmate Rafael has been brutally murdered. His widow is Gabriel's old friend Carolina Ferrer, whose husband Miguel was also recently killed. Gabriel begins having visions of his ex-girlfriend Ángel, who died ten years earlier at Piedra Feliz, a cliff infamous for the numerous suicides that have occurred there. Gabriel fears that the murders are connected to Ángel's death and that Carolina and Lorena, another one of his friends, could be the next targets. Gabriel discloses to Carolina the truth about his relationship with Ángel and shows her footage of Miguel raping Ángel after she discovered that he was only with her as part of a bet.

Cast 
 Álvaro Morales as Gabriel Echeverría
 Andrea Freund as Carolina viuda de Ferrer
 Blanca Lewin as Angel Cruz
 Juan Pablo Bastidas as Miguel Ferrer

Production 
Director Jorge Olguín wanted to make a homage to his favorite filmmakers, John Carpenter and Dario Argento.  He decided to use all the standard giallo and slasher film tropes and cliches but with a unique Latin American flavor.  Shooting took 20 days and was in Santiago.

Release 
Ángel Negro premiered on October 31, 2000, and it entered wide release in Chile on November 1, 2000.  Troma Entertainment released it on DVD in the United States on October 25, 2003.

Reception 

Mike Long of DVD Talk rated it 1/5 stars and called it "dull, pointless, and unoriginal."  David Johnson of DVD Verdict wrote that the film "is not piss-poor by any means, but it certainly won't change the way you look at horror movies."

References

External links 
 

2000 films
2000 horror films
2000s slasher films
Films shot in Chile
Films set in Chile
Films set in 1990
Films set in 2000
2000 directorial debut films
Chilean horror films